Strellin may refer to:

Strellin, part of the German municipality of Groß Kiesow
German name of Strzelno, Pomeranian Voivodeship